Zana Šiškin (born in September 1961) is a Serbian former singer, best known as the first frontress of the pop rock band Zana.

Biography

Zana Nimani was born in 1961 in Belgrade, to Kosovo Albanian parents from the town of Đakovica. Nimani started her career in 1976, when she started to sing with the band Suton, in which her (at the time) boyfriend Radovan Jovićević played guitar. Since 1979, the band started to perform under the name Zana. The band's debut album, Loše vesti uz rege za pivsku flašu (Bad News Accompanied by Reggae for a Beer Bottle), released in 1981, brought them nationwide popularity. The following two albums, Dodirni mi kolena (Touch My Knees), released in 1982, and Natrag na voz (Back to the Train), released in 1983, were also well received. However, when Zana went on a hiatus in 1984, Nimani decided to leave the band (which would continue to work under the name Zana).

In 1986, she released her only solo album, Noćas pevam samo tebi (Tonight I Sing Only for You). The album was recorded in Sweden and featured Swedish studio musicians. It was produced by Tini Varga, who also authored part of the songs. Other authors on the album were Nimani herself and former Zana members Marina Tucaković, Aleksandar "Futa" Radulović and Bogdan Dragović. The album brought such minor hits as "Što ne znam gde si sad" (Why Don't I Know Where You Are Now) and "Miško zna" (Miško Knows).

During the same year, she appeared at the MESAM Festival with the song "Ruža na dlanu" (Rose on the Palm), which was released on a split 7-inch single, with a Bebi Dol song "Inšalah" (Inshallah). Soon after, she retired from the scene. She is married to Đorđe Šiškin. Nimani and Šiškin have one child: daughter Tea (born in Belgrade in 1991). With the breakup of Yugoslavia, she moved to Canada.

Discography

With Zana

Studio albums
Loše vesti uz rege za pivsku flašu (1981)
Dodirni mi kolena (1982)
Natrag na voz (1983)

Singles
"Nastavnice" / "Sveta" (1980)
"Moj deda" / "Pepito pantalone" (1981)
"Leto" / "Snovi od slame" (1981)
"On" / "Ti si neko staro lice" (1981)
"Jabuke i vino" / "Jabuke i vino – Instrumental" (1983)

Solo

Studio albums
Noćas pevam samo tebi (1986)

Singles
 "Inšalah" / "Ruža na dlanu" (split single with Bebi Dol; 1986)

References

External links
 Zana Nimani at Discogs
 Zana Nimani at Last.fm
 EX YU ROCK enciklopedija 1960–2006, Janjatović Petar;  

1961 births
Living people
Yugoslav Albanians
Albanians in Serbia
Singers from Belgrade
Serbian women singers
Serbian rock singers
Serbian pop singers
Yugoslav women singers
Yugoslav rock singers
Yugoslav emigrants to Canada
Women new wave singers
Pop rock singers